Daviot can refer to two villages in Scotland:

Daviot, Aberdeenshire
Daviot, Highland

For the writer Gordon Daviot, see Josephine Tey
George Daviot, character in Action for Slander